Dimitris Zagylos (15 March 1938 – 10 June 2022) was a Cypriot professional footballer who played as a right winger and a later manager. His nickname was "Dimitrakis"

Club career
Zagylos started football at Anorthosis Famagusta, from 1953. In 1958, he emerged as the top scorer of the league with 21 goals. With Anorthosis he won 3 championships, and a Cypriot Cup in 1959.

In the summer of 1961, he transferred to AEK Athens, who paid the sum of 320,000 drachmas for his acquisition. Zagylos showed aspects of his talent in Greece as well, standing out for his inexhaustible combativeness, his elaborate game and his excellent attacks, however, due to injuries, he did not perform as well as he could. In April 1962 he secretly left for Cyprus, because AEK had not found him a job as promised. In fact, he had worked for two weeks in the shop of an agent of AEK, but was fired without knowing the reason. After almost a month he came back after the people of AEK assured him that they would find him a job with a satisfactory salary. With AEK he won the Greek championship in 1963.

He played in AEK until October 1963 and then returned to Anorthosis, winning another Cup in 1964, scoring in the final against APOEL. He played at the club of Famagusta until 1968, when he finished his football career. He is the fourth scorer in the history of Anorthosis with 93 goals in 166 appearances.

International career
Zagylos was an international footballer with Cyprus.

Managerial career
After the end of his football career, Zagylos also worked as a coach at Enosis Neon Paralimni, winning the Cypriot Second Division and the to the First Cypriot Division in 1969.

Personal life
Zagylos died on the morning of 10 June 2022, at the age of 84.

Honours

As a player

Anorthosis Famagusta
Cypriot First Division: 1956–57, 1957–58, 1959–60
Cypriot Cup: 1958–59, 1963–64

AEK Athens
Alpha Ethniki: 1962–63

Individual
Cypriot First Division top scorer: 1957–58

As a manager

Enosis Neon Paralimni
Cypriot Second Division: 1968–69

References

Works cited

1938 births
2022 deaths
Cypriot footballers
Association football forwards
Cyprus international footballers
Cypriot First Division players
Super League Greece players
Anorthosis Famagusta F.C. players
AEK Athens F.C. players
Cypriot football managers
Enosis Neon Paralimni FC managers
Expatriate footballers in Greece
Cypriot expatriate sportspeople in Greece
Cypriot expatriate footballers
Greek Cypriot people
People from Paralimni